Stanlow and Thornton railway station is located within the Stanlow Refinery in Cheshire, England. It lies on the Hooton–Helsby line with services operated by Northern Trains. The station is surrounded by the refinery site, so as a result most station users are refinery employees. In 2018–19 it was the joint least-used railway station in Britain, tied with Denton in Greater Manchester. In 2020/21, the station was also one of the least used stations in Britain, with 0 entries/exits. Since 3 February 2022 the station has been temporarily closed due to safety concerns of the footbridge which is the only entrypoint to the station.

History

The station was opened on 23 December 1940 jointly by the Great Western Railway and the London, Midland and Scottish Railway. The station served the Shell Thornton Aero Engine Laboratory (AEL), which was responsible for developing fuels and oils for the aircraft of the Royal Air Force.

A short distance from the station was a signal box. This controlled all of the sidings used for freight. Shell stopped using rail as a method of transportation of goods, and subsequently, the sidings were removed. Eventually, the signal box was dismantled and donated to the Embsay & Bolton Abbey Steam Railway. Today, the signals for this line and station are controlled at Helsby and Ellesmere Port signal boxes, operated by Network Rail.

The station was originally earmarked for closure under what is known today as the Beeching Axe, a report created by Dr. Beeching entitled "The Reshaping of British Railways". This was a report commissioned by the government to find out how money could be saved, as use of the railways began to decline.

Quietest station in the UK 

Station usage statistics for 2004–05 showed 40 passengers using the station, less than one per week. Passenger numbers began to increase at the station in 2005–06, with 130 people using it in 2005–06. This rose sharply to 326 in 2006–07, despite the same rail services being operated.

In January 2020 the station was named as the joint quietest in the UK, alongside Denton Station in Greater Manchester, with just 46 entries and exits in the period 1 April 2018 to 31 March 2019. Passengers increased to 82 the following year, but Stanlow and Thornton remained one of only six British stations to serve fewer than 100 annual passengers.

Facilities

At this station there are covered shelters, with three metal seats on either platform. There is a payphone located on the Helsby platform.

A footpath leads from the road to a flight of 48 steps with 2 rest landings and a handrail onto a footbridge. From the footbridge to the left, the first flight of 30 steps with rest landing and handrail leads to the Helsby platform, and the second flight of 30 steps with rest landing and handrail leads to the Ellesmere Port platform. The station is definitely not accessible for people with mobility problems.

The booking office is still extant at the Ellesmere Port platform, but has been closed for some time. It now houses the electrics for the station and is boarded up.

Although not controlled by Northern Trains, the station does have CCTV monitored by the security services at the Essar oil refinery.

There is limited car parking at the entrance of the station.

The station is now unstaffed with no ticket office so passengers buy tickets from a conductor on board the train.

Services 

No trains currently call at this station due to it being closed because of safety concerns. It used to receive 4 trains a day on weekdays and Saturdays. These services were from Helsby to Ellesmere Port and return, except for the final evening service which went to Liverpool Lime Street. There is no estimate as to when services may resume.

The North Cheshire Rail User Group supports and actively campaigns for an improved service at this station and for this railway line.

Public transport interchange

The station is located on Oil Sites Road, a private road owned by Essar Oil. This is now closed to motor vehicles, except for access to the site. The original owner, Shell, had cited increased commercial traffic to its refinery and the number of public vehicles using the road, recklessly in some cases, as reasons for closure. The road previously also allowed quick access to the villages of Ince and Elton from Ellesmere Port and beyond.

Although it is theoretically accessible by foot, it involves a long walk from either Ellesmere Port, Ince or Elton, all of which have their own railway stations. There are no bus or taxi services at this station due to the access restrictions.

References

Notes

Sources

Further reading

External links 

Railway stations in Cheshire
DfT Category F2 stations
Former Birkenhead Railway stations
Railway stations in Great Britain opened in 1940
Low usage railway stations in the United Kingdom
Former Northern franchise railway stations